Anne-Marie Losique (also known by the stage name AML born July 14, 1965) is a television producer, television host and singer in Quebec, Canada. Along with Marc Trudeau, she is co-founder of production company Image Diffusion International. She is the daughter of Serge Losique, president and founder of the Montreal World Film Festival. She's the owner and current CEO of VanessaTV (now VividTV Canada), the first French adult entertainment channel in Quebec.

Profile 
Losique studied theatre at La Sorbonne in Paris. She first became famous as the host of Box-office, a cinema television magazine. Quebec comedians soon parodied her as a ditzy gal with the perpetual giggles (something she has been known for), but later ventures showed her potential as a businesswoman, now producing a vast array of trendy television shows through IDI seen across Canada (see the list of her productions).

She also produced songs (dance music and other) and shot risqué music videos. She also shot one for a retake on Brigitte Bardot's Tu veux ou tu veux pas, which is itself suggestive.  In her producing career, she has shown an interest for the sex industry, hosting some of her sex-related shows herself. This earned her to be called "Sex mogul" in an article of alternative weekly The Montreal Mirror.  Her propensity for seductive provocation has created an image and a slight controversy, which she parodied in her mockumentary Bimbo, fantasmes et réalité.

Losique cast herself, along with pop singer Jacynthe, in her own adaptation of The Simple Life, La Vie rurale.  She is also responsible for the importation of the American reality show The Surreal Life (Des gens pas ordinaires) and the British comedy The Office (La Job). She had bought rights to an adaptation of the Thierry Ardisson's French talk show 93, Faubourg Saint-Honoré but chose not to renew them for financial reasons.

See also 
 Image Diffusion International (with the list of her productions)
 List of Quebec television series imports and exports
 List of Quebec television series
 Television of Quebec
 Culture of Quebec

External links 
 
 Anne-Marie Losique official site
 List of IDI productions broadcast via CHUM Television, with descriptions
 "Sex mogul" at The Montreal Mirror

Videos
 Another video of Losique teased by Ben Affleck on the set of The Sum of All Fears at Sympatico.msn.com (works with Microsoft Internet Explorer Only)
 Anne-Marie Losique in the music video for "Tu veux ou tu veux pas" at Sympatico.msn.com (works with Microsoft Internet Explorer Only)
 Anne-Marie Losique in the music video for "Taxi" at Sympatico.msn.com (works with Microsoft Internet Explorer Only)
 Anne-Marie Losique in the Quebec adaptation of The Simple Life at Sympatico.msn.com (works with Microsoft Internet Explorer Only)

Living people
Canadian television producers
Canadian women television producers
Canadian people of Yugoslav descent
Quebecers of French descent
People from Montreal
University of Paris alumni
Place of birth missing (living people)
1965 births